The 1973 Florida Gators football team represented the University of Florida during the 1973 NCAA Division I football season. The season was Doug Dickey's fourth as the Florida Gators football team's head coach.  Dickey's 1973 Florida Gators finished with a 7–5 overall record and a 3–4 Southeastern Conference (SEC) record, tying for fifth among ten SEC teams.

The Tangerine Bowl was temporarily moved from Orlando to Gainesville as the completion of the Citrus Bowl expansion was delayed.  The fans were greeted by a record cold snap, with gametime temperatures at 25 degrees Fahrenheit (minus-4 degrees Celsius); the cold weather benefited the visiting Miami Redskins, who won 16–7.

Schedule

Roster

Game summaries

Kansas State

Southern Miss

Mississippi State

LSU

Alabama

Ole Miss

Auburn

Don Gaffney made the start, becoming the first black quarterback in school history, and Florida won at Jordan–Hare Stadium for the first time.

vs. Georgia

Kentucky

at Miami (FL)

Florida's defense held the Hurricanes out of the end zone from the five-yard line with 33 seconds left in the game.

Florida State

Tangerine Bowl

Awards and honors
Ricky Browne
1st Team All-SEC (AP)

David Hitchock
2nd Team All-SEC (AP)

Burton Lawless
2nd Team All-SEC (AP)

Lee McGriff 
2nd Team All-SEC (AP)

Ralph Ortega
1st Team All-SEC (AP, UPI)

Jim Revels
1st Team All-SEC (AP)

Jimmy Ray Stephens
2nd Team All-SEC (AP)

References

Florida
Florida Gators football seasons
Florida Gators football